Charles Harris Belton (christened 30 April 1820 – 1 January 1891) was an English cricketer. Born at Aylesford, Kent, Belton was a batsman who played regularly for Town Malling during the 1840s and 1850s.

Belton made two first-class cricket appearance for Kent County Cricket Club in 1847. Both came against Surrey, firstly at The Oval and then at Preston Hall, Aylesford. Belton scored 41 runs in his two matches, with a top-score of 23. He took seven catches.

Belton was the son of a farm bailiff and worked in a variety of jobs, including as an agricultural labourer, a beer retailer and in Chatham Dockyard. He married Sarah Usher and had six children. He died of a cerebral haemorrhage at Chatham, Kent on 1 January 1891.

References

External links

1820 births
1891 deaths
People from Aylesford
English cricketers
Kent cricketers